Duncan Victor Matthews (born 24 February 1994) is a South African rugby union player for the  in the Currie Cup. He also plays for the Seattle Seawolves in Major League Rugby (MLR) in the United States. He can play as a fullback, winger or centre.

Rugby career

Youth rugby

Matthews was born in Atlantis and attended high school in nearby Malmesbury.

Blue Bulls

After school, he moved to Pretoria to join the  academy. He made ten appearances for their Under-19 side during the 2013 Under-19 Provincial Championship, scoring tries in matches against ,  and  during the regular season, and another one in the final to help his side win the title with a 35–23 victory over the Golden Lions.

He played in eight matches for the s in the 2014 Under-21 Provincial Championship, with tries in matches against  and  during the regular season. For the second season in a row, Matthews was the member of a title-winning team, starting the final of the competition where the Blue Bulls beat  20–10 in Cape Town. He was rewarded with a contract extension by the Blue Bulls, ensuring he would remain in Pretoria until October 2016.

Despite his injury, Matthews signed a further contract extension until October 2018. He returned to make a single appearance for the s attempting to retain their Under-21 Provincial Championship title, starting a match against .

References

South African rugby union players
Living people
1994 births
People from the City of Cape Town
Cape Coloureds
Rugby union centres
Rugby union wings
Rugby union fullbacks
Blue Bulls players
Bulls (rugby union) players
Lions (United Rugby Championship) players
Golden Lions players
Seattle Seawolves players
Rugby union players from the Western Cape